Teresa (also Theresa, Therese) is a feminine given name. 

It originates in the Iberian Peninsula in late antiquity. Its derivation is uncertain, it may be  derived from  Greek   θερίζω (therízō)  "to harvest or reap", or from  θέρος (theros) "summer".
It is first recorded in the form Therasia, the name of Therasia of Nola, an aristocrat of the 4th century.
Its popularity outside of Iberia increased because of saint Teresa of Ávila, and more recently Thérèse of Lisieux and Mother Teresa.

In the United States  it was ranked as the 852nd most popular name for girls born in 2008, down from 226th in 1992 (it ranked 65th in 1950, and 102nd in 1900).  Spelled "Teresa," it was the 580th most popular name for girls born in 2008, down from 206th in 1992 (it ranked 81st in 1950, and 220th in 1900).

People

Aristocracy
Teresa of Portugal (disambiguation)
 Theresa, Countess of Portugal (1080–1130), mother of Afonso Henriques, the first King of Portugal
 Theresa of Portugal, Countess of Flanders (1157–1218), daughter of Afonso Henriques and wife of Philip, Count of Flanders
 Theresa of Portugal, Queen of León (1181–1250), daughter of Sancho I of Portugal and wife of Alfonso IX of León
 Infanta Maria Teresa of Braganza (1793-1874), firstborn child of John VI of Portugal
Teresa Lubomirska, Polish noble lady
Teresa of the Two Sicilies, Empress-consort of Brazil
Teresa, Contessa Guiccioli (1800–1873), the married lover of Lord Byron in Ravenna

Arts
Teresa Berganza, Spanish opera singer
Teresa Brewer, American pop and jazz singer
Teresa Carpenter, Pulitzer Prize-winning American author
Teresa Carpio, Cantopop singer and actress
Teresa Carreño, Venezuelan musician
 Teresa Cheung Siu-wai, Canadian actress and producer
 Teresa Cheung Tak-lan, Hong Kong singer
Teresa Cheung (socialite), Hong Kong socialite and actress
Teresa De Sio, Italian folk singer-songwriter
Teresa Edgerton, American author of fantasy novels and short stories
Theresa Fu, Hong Kong singer and actress
Teresa Gallagher, British actress
Therese Grankvist, Swedish singer
Teresa Graves, American actress and singer
 Teresa Ha, former Chinese television and film actress
Theresa Harris, American actress, dancer and singer
Theresa Ikoko, British playwright 
Tereza Kesovija, ex Yugoslav and Croatian singer
Theresa Lee, Hong Kong-born Canadian actress
Teresa Mak, Hong Kong actress
Teresa Medeiros, American romance novelist
 Teresa Mo, Hong Kong actress
Teresa Nielsen Hayden, American writer and teacher
Teresa Palmer, Australian actress
Teresa Parente, American actress
Theresa Randle, American actress
Teresa Reichlen, American ballet dancer
Theresa Russell, American actress
Theresa Saldana, American actress
Teresa Salgueiro, Portuguese singer
Theresa Sokyrka, Canadian singer-songwriter
Teresa Stratas, Canadian soprano
Teresa Teng, Taiwanese queen of pop
Teresa Villaverde, Portuguese film director
Lady Teresa Waugh, British novelist and translator
Teresa Wright, Academy Award-winning American actress
Teresa Żarnowerówna, Polish avant-garde artist

Politics
Theresa Ahearn (1951-2000), Irish Member of Parliament
Theresa Berg Andersen (born 1979), Danish politician
Teresa Aquino-Oreta (born 1944), Filipino politician 
Teresa Bellanova, Italian Minister of Agriculture
Teresa Cheng (politician), Hong Kong Justice Minister
Teresa Gutierrez, American politician
Teresa Heinz (born 1938), former widow of U.S. Senator H. John Heinz III; wife of Senator John Kerry
Teresa Isaac, American politician, former mayor of Lexington, Kentucky
Teresa Kok, Malaysian Member of Parliament
Theresa May, former Prime Minister of the United Kingdom and Leader of the Conservative Party; UK Member of Parliament
Teresa Mosqueda, American politician
Teresa Pearce, former UK Member of Parliament
Teresa Reyes Sahagún, Mexican politician
Teresa Ribera (born 1969), Spanish jurist, university professor and politician
Teresa Riera (born 1950), Spanish politician
Teresa Rodríguez, Spanish politician
Teresa Tomlinson, American politician
Theresa Villiers, UK Member of Parliament
Teresa Wat, Canadian member of the Legislative Assembly of British Columbia

Religion
List of saints named Teresa
Teresa Chikaba, Ghanaian princess declared Venerable by the Catholic Church
Teresa Demjanovich, American nun of the Sisters of Charity

Sports
Teresa Ciepły, Polish sprinter
Teresa Earnhardt, widow of racing legend Dale Earnhardt
Teresa Edwards, American basketball player
Tereza Kmochová, Czech alpine skier 
Teresa Machado, Portuguese athlete
Teresa Piccini, Mexican ten-pin bowler
Teresa Rivera, Mexican swimmer
Teresa Rohmann, German medley swimmer
Teresa Ruiz, American State Senator from New Jersey
Teresa Vaill, American racewalker
Theresa Zabell, Spanish sailor

Other
Teresa Cormack, murder victim from New Zealand
Theresa Lawson (1951-2014), Australian convicted of embezzlement
Teresa Magbanua, Filipino schoolteacher and revolutionary
Teresa Manera, Argentine paleontologist
Teresa Meana Suárez (born 1952), Spanish feminist activist, teacher, and philologist
Teresa Rodrigo (1956-2020), Spanish scientist
Teresa Sampsonia, Persian noblewoman, diplomat, adventuress
Teresa Webber, British palaeographer, medievalist, and academic
Teresa Sickles, wife of Daniel Edgar Sickles, who stood trial for killing her lover

Fictional characters
Teresa Tracy Bond (née Di Vicenzo), Bond girl and wife of James Bond in the film On Her Majesty's Secret Service
Teresa Bryant, on the British soap opera Coronation Street
Theresa Burke, wife of main character Ethan Burke on the American TV series Wayward Pines
Teresa Cammeniti, on the Australian soap opera Neighbours
Theresa Rourke Cassidy, alter-ego of the Marvel Comics heroine Siryn
Teresa Chávez, protagonist and villain from the TV series Teresa
Theresa "Tess" Durbeyfield, title character of Thomas Hardy's novel Tess of the d'Urbervilles
Theresa Fowler, from the animated TV series Randy Cunningham: 9th Grade Ninja
Theresa "Tessa" Gray, protagonist and main character of The Infernal Devices novel series by Cassandra Clare
Tessie (Teresa) Hutchinson, the only character to protest the village tradition of stoning in Shirley Jackson's The Lottery
Teresa Lisbon, one of the main characters in the drama The Mentalist
Theresa Lopez-Fitzgerald, a main character in the soap opera Passions
Theresa Terri McGreggor, in Degrassi: The Next Generation
Theresa McQueen, from the British soap opera Hollyoaks
Teresa Moreno, wife of Richard Sharpe in Bernard Cornwell's Sharpe series of historical fiction
Teresa Parker, long lost younger sister of Peter Parker / Spider-Man from Marvel Comics.
Theresa Russo, from Wizards of Waverly Place
Theresa Spencer, girlfriend and research partner of the character Daniel Faraday from the TV series Lost
Teresa Wisemail, from the PlayStation role-playing game Suikoden II
Theresa, an immortal seeress, one of the main characters in the Fable video game series
Teresa (Barbie), a fashion doll and Barbie's best friend
Teresa, from James Dashner's book series The Maze Runner
Tereza, from Milan Kundera's novel The Unbearable Lightness of Being
Theresa (a.k.a. The Fighter), one of the main characters from the Canadian animated series Class of the Titans
Teresa of Telezart, important character from the second series of the long-running space opera franchise Space Battleship Yamato
Teresa of the Faint Smile, in Claymore
Boos, known in Japan as Teresa, are ghosts from the Mario and Yoshi series of video games.
Teresa Mendoza, protagonist and drug cartel leader from Queen of the South
Theresa Keller, a new girl from the children's program Heidi (2015 TV series)
Theresa Servopoulos, from The Last of Us

See also
Maria Theresa (disambiguation)
Marie Thérèse (disambiguation)
Therese (disambiguation)
Theresia
Terisa
Tirzah (disambiguation)

Notes

Feminine given names
English feminine given names
Italian feminine given names
Lithuanian feminine given names
Polish feminine given names
Portuguese feminine given names
Spanish feminine given names